Thomas Eliot or Elliot may refer to:

Eliot
Thomas Eliot (died 1626), son of Sir John Eliot
Thomas D. Eliot (1808–1870), US Representative from Massachusetts
Thomas Lamb Eliot (1841–1936), Oregon pioneer
T. S. Eliot (Thomas Stearns Eliot, 1888–1965), modernist author and poet
Thomas H. Eliot (1907–1991), American lawyer, politician and academic

Elliot
Thomas Elliot (organ builder) (1759–1832), English organ builder
Thomas Frederick Elliot (1808–1880), British government official, appointed Agent-General for Emigration in 1837
Tom Elliot (rugby union, born 1880) (1880–1948), Scotland international rugby union player
Tom Elliot (1926–1998), Scotland international rugby union player
 Tommy Elliot (born 1941), Scotland international rugby union player
Thomas Elliot (footballer) (born 1979), Caymanian footballer
Hush (character) or Tommy Elliot, a comic book character

See also
Thomas Elliot Harrison (1808–1888), British engineer
Thomas Elliott (disambiguation)